Bornean mountain whistler may refer to:

 Bornean whistler, a species of bird endemic to the island of Borneo
 Rusty whistler, a species of bird  endemic to New Guinea

Birds by common name